Kortala is a village and municipality in the Balakan Rayon of Azerbaijan.  It has a population of 2,996.  The municipality consists of the villages of Kortala, Biçiqarbinə, and Qarahacılı.

References 

Populated places in Balakan District